Dennehof may refer to:

 Dennehof, Gauteng, a suburb of Johannesburg, South Africa
 Dennehof, Western Cape, a settlement in Overberg District Municipality, Western Cape, South Africa